Reichhardt is a surname. Notable people with the surname include:
Cynthia Olson Reichhardt, American physicist
Peter Reichhardt (born 1967), Danish actor and theatre director
Poul Reichhardt (1913–1985), Danish actor, father of Peter

Surnames from given names